Seidai Dam  is an earthfill dam located in Hokkaido Prefecture in Japan. The dam is used for irrigation. The dam impounds about 51  ha of land when full and can store 3767 thousand cubic meters of water. The construction of the dam was completed in 1937.

References

Dams in Hokkaido